Ahafo Ano South East is one of the constituencies represented in the Parliament of Ghana. It elects one Member of Parliament (MP) by the first past the post system of election. Ahafo Ano South East is located in the Ahafo Ano South district of the Ashanti Region of Ghana.

Boundaries
The seat is located within the Ahafo Ano South District of the Ashanti Region of Ghana. This constituency was part of the newly created constituency for the 2016 general elections in Ghana.

Members of Parliament

Elections

See also
List of Ghana Parliament constituencies

References

Parliamentary constituencies in the Ashanti Region